Mathematical modelling competitions are team competitions for students that aim to promote mathematical modelling to solve problems of real-world importance. Several types of math contests exist. Contests are held at all levels, from grade school to undergraduate college students.

See also 
 Mathematical Contest in Modeling
 MathWorks Math Modeling Challenge
 International Mathematical Olympiad
 List of mathematics competitions

References 

Mathematics competitions
Mathematics education